Rashica is a Kosovan surname. Notable people with the surname include:

 Andin Rashica (born 1990), Kosovan basketball coach
 Milot Rashica (born 1996), Kosovan footballer
 Valdrin Rashica (born 1994), Kosovan footballer

Albanian-language surnames